Constantin Dumitrescu may refer to several Romanian people:

Constantin Dumitrescu (boxer)
Constantin Dumitrescu (general)
Constantin Ticu Dumitrescu